Ken "Fleetwood Smith" Baxter (20 August 1917 – 27 April 1959) was an Australian rules footballer in the Victorian Football League (VFL).

Family
The son of William John Baxter, and Margaret Baxter, née Nihill, Kenneth Matthew Patrick Baxter was born on 20 August 1917.

His brother, Bernie Baxter also played with Carlton.

He married Alice Maisie Diggins in 1944.

Death
He died, suddenly, on 27 April 1959.

Footnotes

References

 World War Two Service Record: Private Kenneth Matthew Patrick Baxter (VX110353): Department of Veterans' Affairs, Australia.

External links

 
 Ken Baxter at Blueseum
 Ken Baxter's obituary
 Boyles Football Photos: Ken Baxter.

1917 births
1959 deaths
Carlton Football Club players
Carlton Football Club Premiership players
Australian rules footballers from Melbourne
Three-time VFL/AFL Premiership players
People from Werribee, Victoria